Friese  may refer to:
 Carl Friese, an American mycologist
 Christian-Peter Friese, (1948-1970), victim at the Berlin wall
 Donald Friese (born 1940), American billionaire businessman
 Friedemann Friese (born 1970), German board game designer
 Heinrich Friese (1860–1948), German entomologist
 Peter Friese (born 1952), German art historian and curator
 Richard Friese (1854–1918),German animal and landscape painter
 Werner Friese (1946–2016), East German football player

and also :
 Friese Buurt, a hamlet in the Dutch province of North Holland
 Friese-Greene, a disambiguation page

German-language surnames